Eupithecia albirivata is a moth in the  family Geometridae. It is found in Peru and Ecuador.

References

Moths described in 1904
albirivata
Moths of South America